Andrea Huisgen Serrano (born 22 June 1990) is a German-Spanish model and beauty pageant titleholder who was crowned Miss España 2011, the official representative to Miss Universe 2012. Andrea studied Law and works as a model in Barcelona. Born to a Spanish mother and a German father, she speaks German, English, and French in addition to Spanish and Catalan.

Miss España 2011
Miss Barcelona, Andrea Huisgen Serrano has been crowned Miss España 2011 (Miss Spain 2011) by Paula Guilló Sempere, Miss Spain 2010, at the 51st edition of the Miss Spain beauty pageant held at the Palacio de Los Sueños in Seville on 27 November 2011. Huisgen was the last Miss España crowned before the Spanish beauty contest went bankrupt.

References

1990 births
Living people
Miss Spain winners
Spanish people of German descent
Miss Universe 2012 contestants